Neohindeodella is an extinct genus of conodonts. Neohindeodella detrei, a species of Neohindeodella, has the distinction of being the last species of conodont to finally become extinct, during the Hettangian stage of the early Lower Jurassic Period.

Species
Neohindeodella aequiramosa Kozur & Mostler, 1970
Neohindeodella benderi (Kozur & Mostler, 1970)
Neohindeodella budorovi (Burij, 1979)
Neohindeodella curvata Kozur & Mostler, 1970
Neohindeodella detrei Kozur & Mock, 1991
Neohindeodella dropla (Spasov & Ganev, 1960)
Neohindeodella excurvata Götz, 1995
Neohindeodella germanica Götz, 1995
Neohindeodella mombergensis (Tatge, 1956)
Neohindeodella nevadensis (Müller, 1956)
Neohindeodella rhaetica Kozur & Mock, 1991
Neohindeodella riegeli (Mosher, 1968)
Neohindeodella suevica (Tatge, 1956)
Neohindeodella sulcodentata (Budurov, 1962)
Neohindeodella summesbergeri Kozur & Mostler, 1970
Neohindeodella summesbergeri summesbergeri Kozur & Mostler, 1970
Neohindeodella summesbergeri praecursor Kozur & Mostler, 1970
Neohindeodella triassica (Müller, 1956)
Neohindeodella triassica triassica (Müller, 1956)
Neohindeodella triassica aequidentata Kozur & Mostler, 1970
Neohindeodella vietnamica Thang, 1989

References

Conodont genera